Katherine Kane was an American Democratic politician from Boston, Massachusetts. She represented the 3rd Suffolk district in the Massachusetts House of Representatives from 1965 to 1968.

References

Year of birth missing
Year of death missing
Members of the Massachusetts House of Representatives
Women state legislators in Massachusetts
20th-century American women politicians
People from Boston
20th-century American politicians